Rujinan Phanseethum, nicknamed Mameaw (born in Udon Thani) is a Thai beauty queen who was crowned Miss Earth Thailand 2009 and a top eight finalist in the Miss Earth 2009 international pageant.

Pageantry
Phanseethum competed and won first runner-up in the Miss Thailand Universe 2009.  She was also crowned Miss Thailand Earth 2009 in Bangkok, Thailand on March 28, 2009. She represented Thailand in the Miss Earth 2009 and placed as one of the top eight finalists, which was held in Boracay, Philippines on November 22, 2009.

References

External links
Miss Thailand Universe Official Website

Living people
Miss Earth 2009 contestants
Rujinan Phanseethum
1989 births
Miss Earth Thailand